Eternal Silence may refer to:
Eternal Silence (video game), Half-Life 2 mod
Eternal Silence (sculpture), bronze sculpture in Uptown, Chicago